Oktay Abdulkerim oglu Afandiyev (Azerbaijani: Oqtay Əbdülkərim oğlu Əfəndiyev; 26 March 1926 – 26 February 2013) was an Azerbaijani historian, Orientalist, Doctor of Historical Sciences, Professor, Corresponding Member of ANAS and Founder of the Azerbaijan School of Safavid Studies.

Early life 
Oktay Afandiyev was born on March 26, 1926, in the town of Baku in Azerbaijan.

Academic career 
He entered to Baku State University in 1945, but after a year he continued his education in Moscow. He graduated from the Moscow Institute of Oriental Studies and in 1955 defended his doctorate dissertation. In 1993 he became a professor. He worked at the Institute of History of ANAS for about sixty years. He has been a corresponding member of ANAS since 2001.

He mainly studied the Safavid state and its organizations. Afandiyev was also one of the authors of the "Soviet Encyclopedia of Azerbaijan", the multi-volume "History of the USSR" published in Moscow and the "Encyclopedia of Soviet History", the "Islamic Encyclopedia" published in Istanbul. O. Afandiyev was a member of the editorial board of the "Azerbaijan National Encyclopedia".

For many years, O.Afendiyev, who headed the "Medieval History of Azerbaijan" department of the Institute of History of ANAS, trained 6 doctors of sciences and 12 candidates of sciences.

He worked Baku State University, Marmara University and Khazar University. From 1994 to 2004, he worked at Khazar University, where he was the director of the Institute for Caucasus and Central Asian Studies.

The works of Oktay Efendiev were referred to in their studies by such researchers as W. Floor, H. Halm, I. P. Petrushevsky, G. R Romer, Jean-Paul Roux, F. Sumer, Y. E. Bregel, I. Melikoff, A. Allouch, S. Kitagawa, O. Altstadt, K. Kutsia, E. Gruner, A. Yaman, M. Temizkan, N. Chetinkaya, E. I. Vasilieva, L. P. Smirnova and others

Selected works

Books 
 Образование азербайджанского государства Сефевидов в начале XVI в.. — Б., 1961.
 Азербайджанское государство Сефевидов в XVI веке / Редактор академик А. А. Ализаде. — Б.: Элм, 1981. — 306 с.
 Azərbaycan Səfəvilər Dövləti (азерб.). — Б., 1993. — 304 с.
 Azərbaycan Səfəvilər dövləti (азерб.). — Б.: Şərq-Qərb, 2007. — 407 с.

Articles in Academic Journals 
 К некоторым вопросам внутренней и внешней политики Шаха Исмаила (1502 — 1524 гг.) // Труды Института истории АН Азерб. ССР.. — Б., 1957. — Т. XII. — С. 150–180.
 Из истории социальной и политической борьбы в Азербайджане на рубеже XV — XVI вв. // Краткие сообщения Института востоковедения АН СССР. — 1960. — No. 38. — С. 35–40.
 Некоторые сведения о последних ширваншахах Дербендской династии // Ближний и Средний Восток. — М., 1962.
 О малоизвестном источнике XVI в. по истории Сефевидов // Известия АН Азерб. ССР, серия обществ. наук. — 1964. — No. 2. — С. 61–68.
 Искендер Мунши // Советская историческая энциклопедия. — 1965. — Т. VI. — С. 325.
 Исмаил I // Советская историческая энциклопедия. — 1965. — Т. VI. — С. 351.
 Дон Хуан Персидский или Орудж-бек Баят? // Известия АН Азерб. ССР, серия истории, философии и права. — 1966. — No. 2. — С. 62–70.
 Минадои и его «История войн между турками и персами» // Известия АН Азерб. ССР.. — Б., 1967. — No. 1. — С. 59–66.
 Сефевие // Советская историческая энциклопедия. — 1969. — Т. XII. — С. 815.
 Сефевидов государство // Советская историческая энциклопедия. — 1969. — Т. XII. — С. 815. (совместно с А. П. Новосельцевым)
 Тахмасп I // Советская историческая энциклопедия. — 1973. — Т. XXIV. — С. 153.
 Узун-Хасан // Советская историческая энциклопедия. — 1973. — Т. XXIV. — С. 708.
 Le role des tribus de la langue turque dans la creation de l'Etat Safavide (фр.) // Turcica. — 1975. — No 6. — P. 24–33.
 Сефевиды // Большая советская энциклопедия. — 1976. — Т. XXIII. — С. 325. (совместно с А. П. Новосельцевым)
 Шахсевены // Советская историческая энциклопедия. — 1976. — Т. XVI. — С. 145.
 К освещению некоторых вопросов истории Сефевидов в современной иранской историографии // Против буржуазных фальсификаторов истории и культуры Азербайджана. — Б., 1978.
 О периодизации истории Тебриза в ХV-ХVI вв. // Товарно-денежные отношения на Ближнем и Среднем Востоке в эпоху средневековья. — М., 1979. — С. 237–245.
 Новый труд по истории Сефевидского государства // Известия АН Азерб. ССР. Серия истории, философии и права. — Б., 1979. — No. 4. — С. 133–138.
 О подати тамга и ее значении в городской экономике Азербайджана и сопредельных стран в XV— XVI вв. // Ближний и Средний Восток. Товарно-денежные отношения при феодализме.. — М., 1980. — С. 238–243. (совместно с Ш. Б. Фарзалиевым)
 Сефевиды и Ардебильское святилище шейха Сефи // Бартольдовские чтения 1982 г. Тезисы докладов и сообщений.. — М., 1982.
 On Turkic language tribes in Azerbaijan and Eastern Anatolia in the XV-XVI centuries (англ.) // V. Milletlerarası Türkiye Sosyal ve İktisat Tarihi Kongresi: İstanbul, 21-25 Ağustos 1989 : tebliğ özetleri. — İs.: Marmara Üniversitesi Türkiyat Araştırma ve Uygulama Merkezi, 1989.
 Safavi Devletinin Kuruluşunda Türk Aşiretlerinin Rolü (тур.) // Yabancı Araştırmacılar Gözüyle Alevîlik: Tuttum Aynayı Yüzüme Ali Göründü Gözüme. — İs.: Ant Yayınları, 1989.
 Gence (тур.) // İslâm Ansiklopedisi (англ.)русск.. — 1996. — C. XIV. — S. 17–20.
 Немного о карабахских меликствах // The History of the Caucasus. The scientific-public almanac. — Б., 2001. — No. 3.
 Карабах в составе государств Каракоюнлу, Аккоюнлу и Сефевидов (XV-XV1I вв.) // Карабах. Очерки истории и культуры. — Б., 2004.
 Şirvan'da Osmanlı Hâkimiyetinin yerleşmesi ve ilk Osmanlı idari taksimatına dair (тур.) // Kebikeç: insan bilimleri için kaynak araştırmaları dergisi. — An.: Kebikeç Yayınları, 2007.

Awards 
 Order of the Badge of Honour (1986)
 Shohrat Order (2004)

References

1926 births
2013 deaths
People from Baku
20th-century Azerbaijani historians
Azerbaijani orientalists
Academic staff of Khazar University
20th-century translators
21st-century Azerbaijani historians
Burials at II Alley of Honor